The Taça Armando Arruda Pereira, also knowly Torneio Quadrangular Rio-São Paulo was a tournament organized by São Paulo and Rio de Janeiro state federations reuniting four of the "big eight clubs" of their leagues. 
Armando de Arruda Pereira is the São Paulo's city mayor during 1952.

Participants

Matches

The final match was not played as São Paulo had secured the title

Final standings

Champion

References  

1952 in Brazilian football
Defunct football competitions in Brazil